Nina Proll (born 12 January 1974) is an Austrian actress. She has appeared in more than 50 films and television shows since 1995. She starred in the film September, which was screened in the Un Certain Regard section at the 2003 Cannes Film Festival.

In 1999 she received the Marcello Mastroianni Award given out at the Venice International Film Festival. Proll participated in the third season of the Austrian television dance competition Dancing Stars in 2007, coming in 5th place.

Filmography

References

External links

1974 births
Living people
Austrian film actresses
Actresses from Vienna
Austrian television actresses
20th-century Austrian actresses
21st-century Austrian actresses
Marcello Mastroianni Award winners